Elk Point Airport  is a registered aerodrome located  east of Elk Point, Alberta, Canada.

References

External links
Page about this airport on COPA's Places to Fly airport directory

Registered aerodromes in Alberta
County of St. Paul No. 19